Meet the Press was an Australian Sunday morning talk show focused on the national political agenda, as well as other news, sport and lifestyle issues.

History
Meet the Press was originally a radio and television simulcast between 3DB and HSV-7 in Melbourne. It commenced in 1957, the very early days of television, well before the simultaneous national broadcasting of programs was possible. The original moderator was Herald and Weekly Times journalist Frederick Howard. (The HWT then owned both 3DB and HSV-7.) The radio version was somewhat short-lived but the television program lasted for some time.

The Network Ten version of the program was hosted by former Network Ten news presenter Kathryn Robinson and aired on Sunday mornings at 10:30 am. It ran from October 1992. The program's first guest was the then prime minister, Paul Keating.

As a Sunday morning talk show, usually the format included two guests – a politician and a guest who may be a politician or industry expert. A panel of two journalists joined the presenter to question the guests on the week's political issues and news.

Prior to 2013 the Parliament House bureau chief and political editor Paul Bongiorno shared the presenting role with Hugh Riminton on alternate weeks.

From the show's beginning in 1992 until the end of 2011, the show and production was based at Sydney's Studios. In 2012, the studio production moved to the Networks Melbourne Studios ATV10 and with the change in format, production moved back to Sydney in the Fox Sports studio (owned by producer News Limited).

David Johnston was the original host of the program until Paul Bongiorno replaced him in 1996. Former Ten Eyewitness News Sydney presenter Deborah Knight shared the presenting role with Bongiorno from 2000 until 2009.

In 2010, Ten News'''s senior political correspondent, Hugh Riminton, joined the program to share the presenting role with Bongiorno.

In 2013, former Network Ten Breakfast news presenter Kathryn Robinson was announced as the new host of the show.

In 2014, the show was put on hiatus and has not returned.

Logos

See also

 The Bolt Report''
 List of Australian television series
 List of longest-running Australian television series

References

External links
 

Network 10 original programming
10 News First
Television shows set in Australian Capital Territory
1992 Australian television series debuts
2000s Australian television series
2010s Australian television series
English-language television shows
Australian Sunday morning talk shows
Television shows set in Sydney
Television shows set in Melbourne
2020s Australian television series